EWWL Trocal League for the season 2004–05 was the fourth season of the WABA League. Attended by nine teams from four countries, a champion for the first time in history, became the team Šibenik Jolly. In this season participating clubs from Bosnia and Herzegovina, Croatia, Slovenia, Macedonia and from Austria.

Team information

Regular season
The League of the season was played with 9 teams and play a dual circuit system, each with each one game at home and away. The four best teams at the end of the regular season were placed in the Final Four.

Final four
Final Four to be played 15 and 16 February 2005 in the Dvorana Baldekin in Šibenik, Croatia.

Awards
Finals MVP: Ivona Bogoje (193-C-76) of Šibenik Jolly 
Player of the Year (MVP):
 Anđa Jelavić (172-SG-80) of Šibenik Jolly 
 Vanda Baranović-Urukalo of Gospić Croatia Osiguranje 
 Jelena Dubljević (188-SM-87) of Budućnost Podgorica 
Top scorer: Anica Tešić of Željezničar Sarajevo 

1st Team
Anđa Jelavić (172-SG-80) of Šibenik Jolly 
Jelena Dubljević (188-SM-87) Budućnost Podgorica 
Mensura Hadžić (173-G-70) of Željezničar Sarajevo 
Lidija Milkova (193-C-70) of Kimiko 
Maja Drozg (179-C-81) of Maribor

References

External links
 2004-05 EWWL Trocal League

2004-05
2004–05 in European women's basketball leagues
2004–05 in Serbian basketball
2004–05 in Bosnia and Herzegovina basketball
2004–05 in Slovenian basketball
2004–05 in Republic of Macedonia basketball
2004–05 in Croatian basketball